A. Kodandarami Reddy (born 1 July 1950) is an Indian film director best known for his works in Telugu cinema.
His association with Chiranjeevi created blockbusters in multiple genres such as Nyayam Kavali (1981), Khaidi (1983), Abhilasha (1983), Goonda (1984), Challenge (1984), Donga (1985), Rakshasudu (1986), Pasivadi Pranam, Donga Mogudu (1987), Athaku Yamudu Ammayiki Mogudu (1989),  Kondaveeti Donga (1990), and Muta Mestri (1993). In 2013 he received the B. N. Reddy National Film Award for Life Time Achievement.

Personal life
Reddy was born near Nellore, in a small beach town Mypadu, into an agricultural family. Reddy is married to Bharathi. Their elder son, Sunil Reddy, is a business man-turned-actor, in Tamil cinema. He made his film debut, in Seethakaathi (2018), in which he played a negative role. He directed the 2007 film, Godava, under his home production, to launch his second son, Vaibhav Reddy.

Reddy made around 94 movies and almost 90% of them were successful. He was also one of the foremost directors, who introduced Ilaiyaraaja to give music for big budget films, in Telugu cinema. His films: Abhilasha, Challenge, Kirathakudu, Rakshasudu, and Kondaveeti Donga were big musical hits of the Chiranjeevi-Reddy-Ilaiyaraaja-Yandamuri Veerendranath combination. He was primarily responsible for Chiranjeevi's Supreme Hero and Mega Star monikers, which started with Khaidi, that released just a few months after Abhilasha, in 1983. Afterwards, he went on to make several blockbusters with Chiranjeevi. The pair earned great reputation with action and thriller films in Telugu cinema.

Filmography

As director

As producer

References

External links

Living people
20th-century Indian film directors
Telugu film directors
Tamil film directors
Kannada film directors
Nandi Award winners
Hindi-language film directors
1950 births
People from Nellore
Film directors from Andhra Pradesh
21st-century Indian film directors